Khidim is a small town in Arghakhanchi District in the Lumbini Zone of southern Nepal. At the time of the 1991 Nepal census it had a population of 3,394 and had 654 houses in the town.

References

There is a high school named Shree pharshawa takura higher secundry school

khulaule

Populated places in Arghakhanchi District